The Campaniloidea is a superfamily of sea snails, marine gastropod mollusks. The Campaniloidea are unassigned in the clade Caenogastropoda.

Taxonomy
The following four families have been recognized in the taxonomy of Bouchet & Rocroi (2005):

Family Campanilidae Douvillé, H., 1904
Family Ampullinidae A. E. M. Cossmann, 1919
Family Plesiotrochidae Houbrick, 1990
† Family Trypanaxidae Gougerot & Le Renard, 1987
(Families that are exclusively fossil are indicated with a dagger †)
Families brought into synonymy
Ampullospiridae Cox, 1930 †: synonym of Ampullinidae Cossmann, 1919
 Diozoptyxidae Pchelintsev, 1960 †: synonym of Campanilidae Douvillé, 1904
 Globulariidae Wenz, 1941: synonym of Ampullinidae Cossmann, 1919
 Gymnocerithiidae Golikov & Starobogatov, 1987 †: synonym of Campanilidae Douvillé, 1904
 Gyrodidae Wenz, 1938 †: synonym of Ampullinidae Cossmann, 1919
 Pseudamauridae Kowalke & Bandel, 1996 †: synonym of Ampullinidae Cossmann, 1919

References 

Sorbeoconcha